The 2019 London Marathon was the 39th running of the annual marathon race in London, United Kingdom, which took place on 28 April. The elite men's race was won by Kenyan Eliud Kipchoge, who took his fourth London Marathon victory in a time of 2:02:37, the second fastest marathon ever at that point. The women's race was won by Brigid Kosgei, also of Kenya, in 2:18:20. American Daniel Romanchuk won the men's wheelchair title in 1:33:38 while Switzerland's Manuela Schär won the women's title in 1:44:09. Changes were made to the course to make it more environmentally friendly; the number of plastic bottles used was reduced and biodegradable alternatives were used instead.

Course

The London Marathon is run over a mainly flat course, starting in Blackheath. The course begins at four separate points and they converge after  during which the course is downhill. At just after  into the race, the runners reach the 19th-century clipper Cutty Sark docked in Greenwich and at about halfway into the race, the runners cross Tower Bridge before heading east into Shadwell and Canary Wharf. After winding through Canary Wharf, the route returns through Shadwell on the other side of the road to which it entered before passing through Tower Hill. The runners enter the underpass in Blackfriars before running along the Thames Embankment, past Westminster and onto Birdcage Walk. The course then runs parallel to St James's Park before turning onto The Mall and finishing in front of Buckingham Palace.

Field
The favourite for the men's race was Eliud Kipchoge, winner of the 2015, 2016, and 2018 editions. Abraham Kiptum was due to race but did not compete due to a biological passport violation, and was later suspended in November for an anti-doping violation. A much anticipated appearance was from Briton Mo Farah despite being an underdog and the bookmaker's second favourite pick. Shura Kitata, runner-up in the 2018 edition, also competed.

In the women's race, defending champion Vivian Cheruiyot and three-time London Marathon winner Mary Keitany were favourites. David Weir was favourite in the men's wheelchair race, having won a total of eight editions of the race. 2018 winner Madison de Rozario raced along with five-time New York City Marathon winner Tatyana McFadden, and Manuela Schär in the women's wheelchair race.

The wheelchair race started at 9:05 BST (UTC+1), the women's race at 9:25 BST, and the men's race at 10:10 BST. A new competition, the Flying 400, was introduced in the wheelchair race. It consisted of a  sprint at the  mark, with the winner receiving $8,000 and second place receiving $3,800 for both the men and women's race. In the other races, the winner received £42,000, with second and third winning £23,000 and £17,000, respectively.

Race summary

In the wheelchair race, Weir fell out of the leading group following the Flying 400 sprint. 20-year-old American Daniel Romanchuk managed to pull away from the lead group in the last kilometre to win in a time of 1:33:38. Marcel Hug of Switzerland and Tomoki Suzuki of Japan finished second and third respectively, while Weir finished fifth. In the women's wheelchair race, Schär dropped the other competitors about 30 minutes into the race, and was able to win in a time of 1:44:09. Rozario and McFadden finished over five minutes later in second and third, respectively.

The women's race contained four pacemakers, and three of them left the rest of the runners behind within the first five minutes of the race. The race had got off to a slow start and they went through  at about 2:20:00 pace. They passed the  mark at about 2:21:00 pace, four minutes slower than the women's only world record set by Keitany at the 2017 edition. The pace slowed even further, passing halfway in 1:11:38. About 90 minutes into the race, Keitany began to drop from the lead group as Kenyan Brigid Kosgei and Cheruiyot began to move away from the rest. At , Kosgei had put a three-second gap between herself and Cheruiyot and just five minutes later had completely dropped her. She managed to hold the lead and finished in a time of 2:18:20, with a second-half split time of 1:06:42, the fastest in women's marathon history. Cheruiyot finished second in 2:20:14, 2018 Dubai Marathon winner Roza Dereje finished third in 2:20:51, whilst Keitany finished fifth.

British tennis player Andy Murray started the men's race. A group of nine formed and they ran at a controlled pace, passing  in 29:01 and halfway in 1:01:37. Once the pacemakers had dropped out, Kipchoge took lead of the group which included Shura, Mule Wasihun, Mosinet Geremew, Farah, Wilson Kipsang Kiprotich, and Tamirat Tola. Kipchoge began to increase the pace, leaving only himself, Mosinet, Mule, and Shura in the lead group by the  point. From mile 20 to 24, they ran a pace of about 4:40 per mile, enough to drop Shura and Mule. However, Kipchoge soon left Mosinet behind after nearly two hours of racing and waved to the crowd as he crossed the finish line in 2:02:37. Mosinet finished second in 2:02:55, Mule finished third in 2:03:16, Shura finished fourth in 2:05:01, and Farah finished fifth in 2:05:39. Kipchoge broke the previous London Marathon record by 28 seconds which he had set in 2016, and also ran the second quickest marathon in history behind his 2018 Berlin Marathon performance.

Non-elite race
About 42,000 runners took part in the non-elite race and the total raised for charities surpassed £1 billion since the race began in 1981. The organisers of the race decided to reduce the number of plastic bottles being used during the race by using biodegradable, edible water pods made of seaweed extract known as Ooho. They were invented by London-based Skipping Rocks Lab. They also reduced the number of water stations from 26 to 19 and reduced the number of plastic bottles on the course by 215,000.

Results

Elite men

Elite women

Wheelchair men

Wheelchair women

References

External links

2019
2019 marathons
2019 sports events in London
April 2019 sports events in the United Kingdom